Robert George Alexander Balchin, Baron Lingfield,  (born 31 July 1942) is a British educationalist, noted as an advocate and pioneer for school autonomy.

Career
Lord Lingfield serves as Chairman of the Trustees of ARNI. He is also the Chairman of the League of Mercy Foundation and a Deputy Lieutenant of Greater London. 

He previously served as Director-General of St. John Ambulance from 1984 to 1990 and was chairman of the Grant-Maintained Schools Centre (formerly Foundation) from 1989 until 1999. He has been Chairman of the Centre for Education Management (now CEFM) since 1995.

Knighted in 1993, becoming styled as Sir Robert Balchin, he was raised to the peerage as a Life Peer on 17 December 2010 as Baron Lingfield, of Lingfield in the County of Surrey.

He was Knight Principal (chairman of the Knights' Council) of the Imperial Society of Knights Bachelor from 2006 to 2012, and he has served as Honorary Colonel of Humberside and South Yorkshire ACF since 2004. The cadet-commandant of Yorkshire Army Cadet Force, Colonel Alan Roberts, OBE, TD, is a long-term associate of Lord Lingfield, serving as gentleman usher of the Imperial Society of Knights Bachelor, receiving an honorary doctorate from Brunel University and being appointed a companion of the Order of Mercy.

A Freeman of the City of London, he is also a liveryman of the Goldsmiths', Broderers', and Apothecaries' companies.

Lord Lingfield is patron of the charity MaleVoicED, a charity supporting all males with Eating Disorders and other co-morbid conditions.

Lord Lingfield sits on the Conservative benches in the House of Lords, and he speaks in parliament mainly on education matters. He has written numerous articles on education and politics. His schools initiative was proclaimed by The Daily Telegraph's deputy editor, Benedict Brogan, as: "[being the] first and, as time passes, perhaps the most important legislative milestone achieved by the Coalition".

Honours

British Honours 
 - Life Peer as Baron Lingfield, of Lingfield, in the County of Surrey (created 17 December 2010)
 - Knight Bachelor (1993)
 - Knight of Justice, Order of St John (1984)

Foreign Honours 

  - Commander, pro Merito Melitensi (1987)

Dynastic Honours 
 - Knight Grand Cross, Royal Order of Francis I (2014)
 - Knight Grand Cross, Order of the Eagle (2014)

Arms

See also 
 Lingfield, Surrey

References

External links
Profile, Debrett's People of Today
Profile, dodonline.co.uk
Profile , Who's Who (2018)

1942 births
Living people
People from Somerset
People from Surrey
People from East Grinstead
Knights of Justice of the Order of St John
Knights Bachelor
Conservative Party (UK) life peers
Deputy Lieutenants of Greater London
British educational theorists
Life peers created by Elizabeth II